The onager (British , , U.S. /ˈɑnədʒər/) was a Roman torsion powered siege engine. It is commonly depicted as a catapult with a bowl, bucket, or sling at the end of its throwing arm. The onager was first mentioned in 353 AD by Ammianus Marcellinus, who described onagers as the same as a scorpion. The onager is often confused with the later mangonel, a "traction trebuchet" that replaced torsion powered siege engines in the 6th century CE.

Etymology 
According to two authors of the later Roman Empire who wrote on military affairs, the onager's name, meaning wild ass, derived from the kicking action of the machine that threw stones into the air. This action resembled the kicking action of the hooves of the wild ass, the Syrian wild ass, a subspecies of onager, which was native to the eastern part of the empire. In Latin this species was known as onagrum.

Design 
The onager consisted of a large frame placed on the ground to whose front end a vertical frame of solid timber was rigidly fixed. A vertical spoke that passed through a rope bundle fastened to the frame had a cup, bucket, or sling attached which contained a projectile. To fire it, the spoke or arm was forced down, against the tension of twisted ropes or other springs, by a windlass, and then suddenly released. As the sling swung outwards, one end would release, as with a staff-sling, and the projectile would be hurled forward. The arm would then be caught by a padded beam or bed when it could be winched back again. It weighed around two to six tons. Flavius Josephus described an instance where an onager shot an 100 pound rock over a 400 yards distance. According to Ammianus Marcellinus, a single-armed onager required eight men to wind down the arm. When it fired, the recoil was so 

great that it made the onager impossible to place on stone walls because the stones would be dislodged. This was confirmed by a reconstructed onager, considerably smaller than the ones described in the sources, that still caused substantial recoil. Its shot weighed 3-4kg.

According to the historian Peter Purton:

History 

The onager was used from the 4th century until the 6th century. It may have originated in the third century BCE. It was initially developed for the purpose of disrupting enemy lines and destroying walls. The late-fourth century author Ammianus Marcellinus describes 'onager' as a neologism for scorpions and relates various incidents in which the engines fire both rocks and arrow-shaped missiles. According to Ammianus, the onager was a single-armed torsion engine unlike the twin-armed ballista before it. It needed eight men just to wind down the arm and could not be placed on fortifications because of its great recoil. It had very low mobility and was difficult to aim. Originally it used a bucket or cup to hold the projectile but at some point it was replaced with a sling, which elongated the throwing arm without burdening it and allowed for a greater range of shot.

In 378, the onager was used against the Goths at Adrianople and although it did not cause any casualties, its large stone projectile was incredibly frightening to the Goths. The late-fourth or early-fifth century military writer Vegetius stipulates that a legion ought to field ten onagers, one for each cohort. These he says should be transported fully assembled on ox carts to ensure readiness in case of sudden attack, in which case the onagers could be used for defense immediately. For Vegetius, the onagers were stone throwing machines.

In the late 6th century the Avars brought the Chinese traction trebuchet, otherwise known as the mangonel, to the Mediterranean, where it soon replaced the slower and more complex torsion powered engines. The onager may have continued to be used by the Byzantines and Arabs during the Middle Ages. In modern history, the mangonel is often misrepresented as an onager although there is no evidence of its usage beyond the 6th century CE.

The first attempts to reconstruction the onager were made by Chevalier de Folard and Robert Melvill in the 18th century. Swiss general Guillaume Henri Dufour made another attempt to reconstruct the onager based off of the work of de Folard in 1840. Napoleon III had his general  Verchère de Reffye create a reconstruction of the onager. By the end of the nineteenth century Sir Ralph Payne-Gallwey made another attempt at reconstructing the onager. Later, the German major-general Erwin Schramm and the British scholar Eric Marsden made a reconstruction of the onager which became the basis of the modern understanding of the weapon.

Effectiveness 
The onager was considered to be less accurate and cruder than the ballista. One reason the onager may have became the Roman military's primary type of torsion catapult because it was easier to produce and required little technical knowledge to operate. The onager was used to destroy walls and create confusion amongst the enemy lines. Ammianus Marcellinus described an instance during an Alemanni incursion in Gaul where although the onager fired a rock that did not kill anyone, it created mass confusion amongst the enemy and routed them.

See also 

 Roman siege engines
 Springald
 Torsion siege engine

References

Bibliography

External links 

 Onager Animation (Misattributed as a "Roman Mangonel")

Roman artillery
Roman siege engines
Medieval siege engines